Western Link or West Link may refer to:

First Great Western Link, a train operating company in the United Kingdom
Western HVDC Link, a high-voltage direct current electricity link under construction in the United Kingdom

See also
Westlink (disambiguation)